Roger Payne is an American biologist.

Roger Payne may also refer to:

Roger Payne (bookbinder) (1739–1797), English bookbinder
Roger Payne (mountaineer) (1956–2012), British mountaineer